Carl Egler (3 July 1896 – 16 August 1982) was a German sculptor. His work was part of the sculpture event in the art competition at the 1928 Summer Olympics.

References

1896 births
1982 deaths
20th-century German sculptors
20th-century German male artists
German male sculptors
Olympic competitors in art competitions
People from Heilbronn (district)